End of the Summer is Dar Williams's third album, released on July 15, 1997 by Razor & Tie.

The album ends with a cover version of "Better Things," a song originally performed by The Kinks on their 1981 album Give the People What They Want.

Joan Baez covered the song "If I Wrote You" on the album Gone from Danger.

Track listing
All songs written by Dar Williams, except where noted.
"Are You Out There" – 3:04
"Party Generation" – 5:09
"If I Wrote You" – 3:52
"What Do You Hear in These Sounds" – 4:30
"The End of the Summer" – 4:12
"Teenagers, Kick Our Butts" – 3:36
"My Friends" – 4:07
"Bought and Sold" – 4:35
"Road Buddy" – 4:20
"It's a War in There" – 2:55
"Better Things" (Ray Davies) – 3:25

Personnel
Dar Williams – Guitar, Vocals
Larry Campbell – Guitar (Acoustic), Dobro, Guitar, Pedal Steel, Bouzouki
Bill Dillon – Guitar, Vocals, Guitar (Electric)
Mark Egan – Bass, Guitar
Shane Fontayne – Guitar (Electric)
Erik Friedlander – Cello
William Galison – Harmonica
Lincoln Goines – Bass (Acoustic)
Charlie Giordano – Accordion
Jeff Golub – Guitar, Guitar (Electric), Slide Guitar
Steven Miller – Guitar (Acoustic), Producer, Engineer
Shawn Pelton – Cymbals, Drums (Snare), Hi Hat
Roger Squitero – Conga, Tambourine
Carol Steele – Timbales
Glen Velez – Tambourine, Bodhran, Pandeiro

Backing vocals by
Dee Carstensen,
Amy Fairchild,
Lorraine Ferro,
Justina Golden,
Lucy Kaplansky,
Katryna Nields,
Nerissa Nields,
Richard Shindell,
Kaz Silver, and
Joyce Zymeck.

References

Dar Williams albums
1997 albums
Razor & Tie albums